A list of films produced by the Tollywood (Bengali language film industry) based in Kolkata in the year 1991.

A-Z of films

References

External links
 Tollywood films of 1991 at the Internet Movie Database

1991
Bengali
 Bengali
1991 in Indian cinema